Tomi Juric (born 22 July 1991) is an Australian professional footballer who plays as a striker for A-League club Melbourne Victory and the Australia national soccer team.

Club career

Adelaide United
On 10 February 2013, after spending a number of seasons abroad in Croatia playing for NK Lokomotiva and NK Inter Zaprešić in the Prva HNL, Juric signed a short-term contract to play for Australian club Adelaide United in the A-League. On 16 February 2013, Juric scored on his Adelaide United debut in a 2–1 defeat at Sydney FC.

Western Sydney Wanderers
On 20 May 2013 Juric signed for Western Sydney Wanderers on a two-year deal, becoming the Wanderers first signing of the A-League off-season. On debut for the Wanderers he scored the equaliser against the Central Coast Mariners in the 1–1 draw on 12 October 2013. Juric scored his first Asian Champions League goal in the Round of 16 against Sanfrecce Hiroshima on 7 May 2014. In a successful first season at Western Sydney, Juric finished with 12 goals in 29 appearances, four of those coming in the 2014 Asian Champions League which his side won, Juric scoring, an amazing goal, the only goal in a 1–0 aggregate win over the Arabian team Al-Hilal.

On 15 January 2015, Juric turned his back on a proposed $10 million move to Chinese Super League side Shanghai Shenhua, opting to chase a move to Europe, where he believed he would have a better chance of staying involved with the Socceroos beyond the 2015 AFC Asian Cup. Juric left the Wanderers on 16 May 2015.

Roda JC
On 15 August 2015, Juric signed a one-year deal with Eredivisie side Roda JC. He made his Eredivisie debut for Roda JC on 20 September 2015 at the Parkstad Limburg Stadion in Kerkrade against Feyenoord as a 71st-minute substitute for Edwin Gyasi. He was released at the end of the 2015–16 season.

FC Luzern
On 2 July 2016, despite interest from the Chinese Super League, Juric joined FC Luzern. On his first appearance for Luzern, Juric manage to score a brace. After scoring four goals in seventeen appearances for Luzern, English club Reading FC who were impressed with his ability to hold up play and trouble defences, were reportedly interested in his services. Despite intense interest from England, Juric further endeared himself to the Luzern faithful and stayed. Though injury troubles slowed him down, Juric finished the 2016–17 Swiss Super League season, with 8 goals in 30 appearances.

Despite a second injury hit season in the 2017–18 Swiss Super League, Juric was once again Luzern's second highest goalscorer with seven goals in 27 appearances.

CSKA Sofia
After his contract with Luzern expired, Juric joined Bulgarian club CSKA Sofia, signing a contract on 27 August 2019. He scored his only goal for the team on 12 September 2020, netting a late equalizer in the 1:1 away draw with  Cherno More in a league match. His tenure at the club lasted for a little over a year, as he failed to get many opportunities to reveal his skills, in part due to injury problems. In June 2020, Juric tested positive for COVID-19. On 18 November 2020 the club confirmed that Juric had been released by mutual consent.

Return to Adelaide United
On 26 November 2020, Juric returned to A-League club Adelaide United. On 19 February 2021, Juric scored a hat-trick consisting of all penalty kicks against the Central Coast Mariners.

Macarthur FC
Juric signed with Macarthur FC in July 2021.

Melbourne Victory
Juric signed with Melbourne Victory in June 2022 on a one-year deal.

International career
On 28 June 2013, Juric was called up to the Socceroos training camp on the Central Coast. Juric made his debut for the Socceroos off the bench in the Socceroos' 2013 EAFF East Asian Cup match against South Korea.

Juric was chosen by Ange Postecoglou, the Australian manager, to take part in the 2015 AFC Asian Cup and on 13 January 2015, Juric scored his first Asian Cup goal against Oman, coming of the bench as a substitute for Tim Cahill. He set up the winning goal in the final in extra time for Australia, holding off Korean defenders and pulling off a nutmeg to put a cross through to James Troisi.

In May 2018 he was named in Australia's 23-man squad for the 2018 World Cup in Russia. He replaced Andrew Nabbout in the match against Denmark in the 64th minute after Nabbout dislocated his shoulder, and started against Peru; however, he was unable to score in both games as Australia were eliminated from the tournament in the group stage, and was himself substituted for Tim Cahill in the match against Peru.

Personal life 
Juric is of Croatian descent. His father is a Bosnian Croat from Kraljeva Sutjeska and his mother is from Zagreb. His younger brother Deni is also a professional soccer player, currently playing for Šibenik.

Career statistics

Club

International
Statistics accurate as of match played 20 November 2018.

International goals
Scores and results list Australia's goal tally first.

Honours
Western Sydney Wanderers
AFC Champions League: 2014

Australia
AFC Asian Cup: 2015

Individual
 A-League All Star: 2014
AFC Champions League Dream Team: 2014

References

External links

1991 births
Living people
Australian people of Croatian descent
Australian people of Bosnia and Herzegovina descent
Australia international soccer players
Association football forwards
NK Croatia Sesvete players
Croatian Football League players
NK Lokomotiva Zagreb players
NK Inter Zaprešić players
Adelaide United FC players
Western Sydney Wanderers FC players
Roda JC Kerkrade players
FC Luzern players
PFC CSKA Sofia players
Macarthur FC players
Melbourne Victory FC players
A-League Men players
Eredivisie players
Swiss Super League players
First Professional Football League (Bulgaria) players
2015 AFC Asian Cup players
2017 FIFA Confederations Cup players
Soccer players from Sydney
AFC Asian Cup-winning players
Australian expatriate soccer players
Expatriate footballers in Croatia
Expatriate footballers in the Netherlands
Expatriate footballers in Switzerland
Expatriate footballers in Bulgaria
Australian expatriate sportspeople in Croatia
Australian expatriate sportspeople in Switzerland
Australian expatriate sportspeople in the Netherlands
Australian expatriate sportspeople in Bulgaria
People educated at Endeavour Sports High School
2018 FIFA World Cup players
Australian soccer players